Neomordellistena picicolor is a beetle in the genus Neomordellistena of the family Mordellidae. It was described in 1952 by Ermisch.

References

picicolor
Beetles described in 1952